The Belgian University Foundation (French: Fondation Universitaire; Dutch: Universitaire Stichting) was founded in 1920. The goal of the Foundation, as was put forward by Emile Francqui, is to promote scientific activity at Belgian universities.

Goals
 To provide grants and study loans to students from less privileged families.
 To help university research centres and laboratories to attract young researchers.
 To stimulate contacts and collaboration between the different Belgian research institutions by supporting scientific publications.
 To organize a Club Universitaire as a meeting place for Belgian and foreign academics.

History
The money for the foundation came from the remaining funds from the Commission for Relief in Belgium (CRB) and the National Committee for Help and Food. The help to the Belgian people during World War I had been organized by Herbert Hoover and Emile Francqui

On 28 August 1919, Herbert Hoover proposed to Emile Francqui, President of the National Committee for Help and Food, and to Léon Delacroix, Prime Minister of Belgium, to use the funds, roughly 150 million Belgian francs, to support university education. The Belgian government decided to give twenty million to each of the four universities, and to use 55 million francs to establish the University Foundation. The remaining funds were used to set up the Belgian American Educational Foundation (BAEF). The first president of the Foundation was Emile Francqui.

Building
The building is located in Brussels (Rue d'Egmont 11) also houses a club, a hotel and a restaurant. There are other institutions located on the premises of the University Foundation like the Belgian American Educational Foundation (BAEF), the Olivaint Conference of Belgium, the Coimbra Group, UNICA, the Organisation of European Cancer Institutes (OECI), the European Nuclear Education Network,...

See also
 Science and technology in Belgium
 Francqui Foundation
 Academia Belgica
 Belgian Academy Council of Applied Sciences
 National Fund for Scientific Research
 List of universities in Belgium
 List of Belgian Nobel laureates

Other Belgian clubs
 Cercle Royal du Parc
 Cercle de Lorraine
 De Warande

External links
 University Foundation

Scientific organisations based in Belgium
Foundations based in Belgium